Kristan Higgins is a New York Times, USA Today, Wall Street Journal, and Publishers Weekly bestselling American author of humorous contemporary romance. She is a three-time winner of Romance Writers of America's RITA Award and a five-time nominee for the Kirkus Prize for Best Work of Fiction.

Biography
Higgins is from Durham, Connecticut. Before writing, she worked in advertising and public relations. She lives with her firefighter husband and two children in Connecticut. She holds a BA in English from the College of the Holy Cross.

Bibliography

Blue Heron series

Gideon's Cove, Maine

Cambry-on-Hudson

Stand-alone novels

Awards and reception

 2008 - Romance Writers of America RITA Award for Best Contemporary Single Title Romance for Catch of the Day
 2010 - Romance Writers of America RITA Award for Best Contemporary Single Title Romance for Too Good To Be True
 2018 - Romance Writers of America RITA Award for Best Mainstream Fiction for Now That You Mention It

Her books have been translated into more than two dozen languages and received numerous starred reviews from Publishers Weekly, Booklist, Library Journal, Kirkus and Romantic Times. She is a five-time nominee for The Kirkus Prize for best work of fiction.

Romantic Times calls Higgins "the master of small-town romance".

Library Journal calls Higgins "the funniest author out there."

Publishers Weekly cited On Second Thought as being written with "uncommon grace and empathy".

References

External links 
 Author's Website
 Author's Blog

Living people
21st-century American novelists
American women novelists
American romantic fiction writers
RITA Award winners
Year of birth missing (living people)
21st-century American women writers
21st-century American writers
Women romantic fiction writers
Novelists from Connecticut
College of the Holy Cross alumni